Andreas Porth (born March 21, 1984) is a German bobsledder who competed from 2005 to 2007. His best Bobsleigh World Cup finish was second in the two-man event twice in the 2006-07 World Cup season.

External links
FIBT profile

1984 births
German male bobsledders
Living people
Place of birth missing (living people)
21st-century German people